Men's college basketball in the Pac-12 Conference began in 1915 with the formation of the Pacific Coast Conference (PCC). Principal members of the PCC founded the Athletic Association of Western Universities (AAWU) in 1959, and subsequently went by the names Big Five, Big Six, Pacific-8, and Pacific-10, becoming the Pac-12 in 2011. Competing in the Pac-12 are the Arizona Wildcats, Arizona State Sun Devils, California Golden Bears, Colorado Buffaloes, Oregon Ducks, Oregon State Beavers, Stanford Cardinal, UCLA Bruins, USC Trojans, Utah Utes, Washington Huskies, and Washington State Cougars. UCLA and USC are scheduled to leave for the Big Ten Conference in 2024.

, Pac-12 schools have won 15 Division I national titles. This was tied with the Atlantic Coast Conference for the most of any conference.  Oregon won the first NCAA tournament in 1939. UCLA has won 11 national titles, the most of any Division I team.  Arizona has won the most recent national title, winning in 1997.  Stanford in 1942, Utah in 1944 and California in 1959 are the other NCAA champions.

List of seasons

Championships by school

All-time school records (ranked according to all time wins)
Through end of the 2021-22 regular season including the NCAA tournament. Records reflect official NCAA results, including any forfeits or win vacating.

Head coaches

Coaches
Note: Stats shown are before the beginning of the season. Overall includes records from other schools.

Notes:
 Stanford & USC coaching salaries are not disclosed due to the Universities being private.
 Pac-12 records, conference titles, etc. are from time at current school and are through the end the 2021–22 season.
 NCAA Tournament appearances are from time at current school only.
 Overall Record, NCAA Final Fours and Championship include time at other schools

Conference honors
The following honors are presented annually by the conference:

Coach of the Year
Player of the Year
Freshman of the Year
Defensive Player of the Year
Sixth Man of the Year
 Most Improved Player of The Year
All-Conference team
All-Defensive team
All-Freshman team

Former players and coaches who have made a significant impact to the tradition and heritage of the conference are recognized in the Pac-12 Hall of Honor. It was exclusively for men's basketball until 2018, when it was opened to all sports.

Notes

References

External links

Pac-12 Conference at Sports-Reference.com